Anita Álvarez de Williams (born in Calexico, California, in 1931) is an American anthropologist, photographer and historian Mexicali-based expert on the Cocopah who wrote the first full-length synthesis of archaeological and ethnographic information on the Baja California peninsula.

Her work has been of great importance to understand the past of Baja California and the borderlands area. She has published The Cocopah People (1974), Travelers among the Cucapa (1975), and Primeros pobladores de la Baja California. Introducción a la antropología de la península (1975), among several books and academic journals both in Mexico and the United States. Her books and articles described natural resource utilization and environmental management, material culture, idea systems, and indigenous history. 

Álvarez founded Mexicali’s University Museum and she was director of the Baja California office of the Instituto Nacional Indigenista (INI). She was known for collected and synthesized information on Cocopa ethnohistory and ethnography. 

In her publications, Álvarez also narrated how the Colorado River has been dammed, detoured, disputed, and contaminated along its entire course so that it no longer reaches its original destination into the Gulf of California. She concludes by stressing the need everyone has for Colorado river to be conserved and allowed to flow through its delta once again.

Work 

 Face and body painting in Baja California: a summary. Pacific Coast Archaeological Society Quarterly. 1973
 Five rock art sites in Baja California south of the 29th parallel. Pacific Coast Archaeological Society Quarterly. 1973
 The Cucapá Indians of the Colorado River delta. Baja California Symposium. 1973
 The Cocopah people. Indian Tribal Series, Phoenix. 1974
 Los Cucapá del delta del Río Colorado. Calafia. 1974
 Primeros pobladores de la Baja California. Gobierno del Estado de Baja California, Mexicali. 1975
 Sea shell usage in Baja California. Pacific Coast Archaeological Society Quarterly. 1975
 Travelers among the Cucapá. Baja California Travels Series 34. Dawson's Book Shop, Los Angeles. 1975
 Assorted facts concerning the eagle in Baja California. Pacific Coast Archaeological Society Quarterly. 1978
 Cocopa. En: Southwest, editado por Alfonso Ortiz, pp. 99-112. Handbook of North American Indians, Vol. 10. Smithsonian Institution, Washington, DC. 1983
 Indian wheat. Baja California Symposium 23. 1985
 Juan de Ugarte. Baja California Symposium 24. 1986
 Environment and edible flora of the Cocopa. Environment Southwest. 1987
 Cocopa beadwork. Pacific Coast Archaeological Society Quarterly. 1991
 Cañon Santa Isabel. Rock Art Papers 10:67-70. San Diego Museum Papers 29. 1993
 Painted caves and sacred sheep: bighorn ethnohistory in Baja California. Counting sheep: 20 ways of seeing desert bighorn. University of Arizona Press, Tucson. 1993
 Cocopah. Native America in the twentieth century: an encyclopedia. Garland Publishing, New York. 1994
 Bark skirts of the Californias. Pacific Coast Archaeological Society Quarterly. 1995
 People and the river. Journal of the Southwest. 1997
 Living with a river. Ponencia en el Quinto Simposio Baja California Indígena, San Diego. 1998
 Primeros pobladores de la Baja California: introducción a la antropología de la península. CONACULTA, Mexicali. 2004

References

External links
Alvarez de Williams: The Cocopah People; and Alvarez de Williams: Travelers Among the Cucupá by Wilke, Philip J.

1931 births
Living people
Historians of Baja California
Archaeologists of the Baja California peninsula
American anthropologists
Photographers from California
21st-century American historians
Hispanic and Latino American artists
American women historians
American women anthropologists
American women photographers
People from Calexico, California
21st-century American women writers
Historians from California